Stephen Huntley Watt (born 1984) is an American computer security consultant and hacker, known for his involvement in the TJX data breach.

After his release from federal prison, he was involved in some security projects, such as the Subgraph OS in 2017.

On August 8, 2014 he and Ladar Levison presented the Dark Internet Mail Environment (DIME) protocol at DEF CON.

References

External links
 https://www.wired.com/2009/06/watt/
 http://www.cgisecurity.com/2009/06/stephen-wattjimjonesunix-terrorist-to-be-sentenced-monday.html
 http://www.prweb.com/releases/2013/1/prweb10349836.htm
 https://www.themarshallproject.org/2016/02/12/what-it-s-like-to-be-a-hacker-in-prison
 http://news.softpedia.com/news/Programmer-Accused-of-Assisting-Hackers-in-the-T-J-Maxx-Hit-97139.shtml

1984 births
Living people
American computer criminals
Place of birth missing (living people)